The subtropical pygmy owl (Glaucidium parkeri) is a species of owl in the family Strigidae. It is found in Bolivia, Colombia, Ecuador, and Peru.

Taxonomy and systematics

The subtropical pygmy owl's specific epithet honors Theodore A. (Ted) Parker III, "who for over twenty years accumulated an unparalleled knowledge of Neotropical birds and graciously shared his vast expertise with all". It is monotypic.

Description

It has a widespread brown morph and a rare rufous morph. Adults of the former have a grayish-brown crown; the crown and the sides of the face have prominent white spots. Its nape, like those of most Glaucidium pygmy owls, has black "false eyes". The back and rump are dark brown and the tail blackish with spotty white bands. The underparts are white with broad dull reddish-olive brown streaks. The juvenile plumage has not been described.

Distribution and habitat

The subtropical pygmy owl is found on the east slope of the Andes from far southwestern Colombia through Ecuador and Peru to central Bolivia. It inhabits humid montane forest.

Behavior

Feeding

The subtropical pygmy owl is active both day and night. Nothing has been published about its diet, which is presumed to be large arthropods and small vertebrates.

Breeding

Nothing has been published about the subtropical pygmy owl's breeding phenology. It is presumed to nest in tree cavities such as old woodpecker holes.

Vocalization

The subtropical pygmy owl's song is "three or four short phrases (normally 2-4 or 6 in intervals of several seconds) of low tone increasing when ending the two notes hu-hu, hu, and having a hesitation before the last note".

Status

The IUCN has assessed the subtropical pygmy owl as being of Least Concern. Its population size is unknown but is believed to be stable.

References

Glaucidium (owl)
Birds described in 1995
Taxonomy articles created by Polbot